Dinumma is a genus of moths in the family Erebidae first described by Francis Walker in 1858.

Description
Palpi smoothly scaled and upturned. Second joint reaching just above vertex of head, and third joint moderate length. Antennae minutely ciliated. Thorax smoothly scaled. Abdomen with a series of dorsal tufts. Tibia moderately hair. Forewings of nearly even width throughout, the apex and outer margin rounded. Hindwings with vein 5 from lower angle of cell.

Species
Dinumma deponens Walker, 1858 India, Thailand, China, Japan, Korea
Dinumma combusta (Walker, 1865) Sundaland
Dinumma hades Bethune-Baker, 1906 New Guinea
Dinumma inagnulata Hampson, 1902 Sikkim
Dinumma mediobrunnea Bethune-Baker, 1906 New Guinea
Dinumma oxygrapha (Snellen, 1880) Singapore, Borneo, Bali, Dammer, Kei, Philippines, Sulawesi
Dinumma placens Walker, 1858 Sri Lanka
Dinumma rubiginea (Bethune-Baker, 1908) New Guinea
Dinumma spiculata Holloway, 2005 Borneo
Dinumma stygia Hampson, 1926 New Guinea
Dinumma varians Butler, 1889 India (Himachal Pradesh)

References

Scoliopteryginae
Noctuoidea genera